Yangzee Football Club was a South Korean football club.

Yangzee was a special football club to aim anti-communism, and was founded by the Korean Central Intelligence Agency (KCIA) on 29 March 1967, after the North Korea national football team reached the quarter-finals in the 1966 FIFA World Cup. Under the then-head of the KCIA Kim Hyong-uk, the club was charged with improving the level of football in South Korea, recruiting the best talent of the time. Participation in the squad took the place of the mandatory military service requirement for Korean nationals, and the players lived and trained at the headquarters of the Intelligence Agency during their time with the team. They also received high salaries and long-term overseas training in return for intensive training. The team dominated the domestic football scene at the time, and in 1969 reached the final of the Asian Club Championship, losing 1–0 to Maccabi Tel Aviv in the final. As Kim's grip on power at the Intelligence Agency slipped away, and interest in the football club waned as relations towards North Korea improved, the team was wound up on 17 March 1970.

Managers
 Choi Chung-min
 Kim Yong-sik

Honours
Asian Champion Club Tournament
Runners-up: 1969

Korean National Championship
Winners: 1968

Korean President's Cup
Winners: 1968

Minor competitions
Pestabola Merdeka: 1967

See also
History of the South Korea national football team
North Korea–South Korea football rivalry

References

External links
Secret Soccer – The Story of Yangzee FC

Association football clubs established in 1967
Association football clubs disestablished in 1970
S
M
1967 establishments in South Korea
1970 disestablishments in South Korea
Police association football clubs in South Korea